The Spanish River is a river in Algoma District, Sudbury District and Greater Sudbury in Northeastern Ontario, Canada. It flows  in a southerly direction from its headwaters at Spanish Lake (west branch) and Duke Lake (east branch) to its mouth at the North Channel of Lake Huron just outside the community of Spanish.

The river's name and the name of the nearby towns of Espanola and Spanish are said to be due to French explorers and Jesuit priests encountering Ojibwe peoples speaking Spanish in the area, apparently as a result of a Spanish woman having been taken captive during an expedition far to the south.

The Spanish River is a provincially significant canoe route with lots of swifts and whitewater. It is therefore mainly used for recreational canoeing and has been protected as a waterway provincial park.

Geography
The river is located almost entirely within the Sudbury District, except for brief passages into the city of Greater Sudbury near the communities of High Falls and Turbine and the river mouth in Algoma District.

Tributaries include Pogamasing Creek, Mogo River, Agnes River, the River aux Sables, the Vermilion River and the Wakonassin River.

The Lower Spanish River Forest houses the world's oldest red pine and white pine forests, and much of that is under provincial protection in the form of provincial parks and reclamation acts.

History

The Spanish River has been used as a transportation corridor for thousands of years, initially by First Nations and later in the 19th century by fur traders. During the late 19th and mid 20th centuries, the river was used to transport timber from logging camps in the upper Sudbury District to Georgian Bay, where they were towed by tugs to sawmills on the Great Lakes.  Until the mid-1960s, pulp wood, mainly jack pine, was driven down the river to the paper mill in Espanola. A diesel tug towed large rafts of logs the length of Agnew Lake to big Eddy dam where they were sluiced down a flume by crews with hand held pike poles.  Secondary flumes took them past the High Falls and Nairn Falls power plants and on to Espanola.  The sap and bark from the pulp logs was a major pollution source in the lower river.

In 1910, the river was the scene of a dramatic train derailment.

Fauna
Fish species found in the Spanish River are:

Alewife
Black Crappie
Bluntnose Minnow
Bowfin
Brown Bullhead
Brook Stickleback
Burbot
Chinook Salmon
Cisco / Lake Herring
Coho Salmon
Common Carp
Fathead Minnow
Johnny Darter
Lake Sturgeon
Lake Trout
Lake Whitefish
Largemouth Bass
Muskellunge
Northern Pike
Northern Redbelly Dace
Pink Salmon
Pumpkinseed
Rainbow Smelt
Rainbow Trout
Silver Redhorse
Shorthead Redhorse
Rock Bass
Smallmouth Bass
Spottail Shiner
Trout-Perch
Walleye
White Sucker
Yellow Perch

Spanish River Provincial Park

The Spanish River Provincial Park protects most of the river and its banks, from its source at Biscotasi Lake (which is separately protected in the Biscotasi Lake Provincial Park) to Agnew Lake. Also included in the park is the entire East Spanish River, Mogo River, as well as large swaths of old-growth white and red pine forest along the course of the Spanish River.

It was established in 2006 and is intended to provide recreational paddling opportunities, in particular for canoeists of intermediate skill level. The park area is also popular for fishing, hunting, and camping.

Despite its remoteness, it is an operational park requiring permits for its use. Facilities included 83 backcountry campsites. All park sites and portages are currently maintained by park staff.

Hydroelectricity

There are 5 hydro-electric generating stations on the Spanish River, 4 of which are owned and operated by Vale Limited to provide power to their mining operations in Sudbury.

See also
List of rivers of Ontario

References

 Shows the river course.

External links

 The Spanish River, connected waterways
 Canoeing the Ancient Forest of the Spanish River
 Webshots, Great Pictures from Spanish River
Pogamasing.com `How the Spanish River Got Its Name`

 
Rivers of Algoma District
Rivers of Sudbury District
Rivers of Greater Sudbury
Tributaries of Lake Huron